Perila is a village in Raasiku Parish, Harju County in northern Estonia.

Composer and choir conductor Gustav Ernesaks (1908–1993) was born in Perila.

References

Villages in Harju County